Chionodes tessa is a moth in the family Gelechiidae. It is found in  North America, where it has been recorded from Washington to Idaho, Oregon, California and Arizona.

References

tessa
Moths described in 1947
Moths of North America